Xu Mian(born 21 February 1987 in Yangzhou) is a former female Chinese diver specializing in 10 metre platform event, the goldlist at 2001 World Championships in Fukuoka, Japan.

References

1987 births
Living people
Sportspeople from Yangzhou
Sportspeople from Jiangsu
Chinese female divers
World Aquatics Championships medalists in diving

Nanjing Sport Institute alumni
21st-century Chinese women